Challakere  is a city municipality (taluk) in Chitradurga district  in the state of Karnataka, India. It is called Oil City with numerous edible oil mills around the city and also Science City as several science and research organizations such as IISc, DRDO, BARC and ISRO have set up their establishments here.

Geography
It has an average elevation of 585 metres (1919 ft).

Demographics
Challakere is the largest taluk of Chitradurga District.  India census, Challakere has a population of 55,194.

Science and research organizations

Challakere is 200 km from Bangalore where an integrated township spread over  has been set up by Indian Space Research Organization (ISRO), Defence Research and Development Organization (DRDO), Indian Institute of Science (IISc) and Bhabha Atomic Research Centre (BARC).

Oil industry
Challakere is also known as the 'oil city' or "second mumbai" of  India because it is the second largest producer/supplier of edible oil after Mumbai. There are as many as 60+ oil industries in Challakere. Not only oil, several other industries like dal, fried gram, rice, etc. are also present. The commercial activity in the town is comparable to that of a standard district and the district enjoys a huge business turnover out of town's business.

Kambali business

Challkere is known for the kambali (woven blankets) made by the local Kuruba people. Challakere kambali are sent to various markets across India. Challakere weekly market Sunday market has the good turnover in the state.

Spiritual places
 Datta Mandira - located in Tyagaraja Nagar, and traditional practices of Datta Sampradaya, can be seen at this temple. 

 Jagalurajja temple (Ajjana Gudi) - located beside the Ajjana Kere, which is the main water source for surrounding wells and drinking water for challakere.

 Challekeramma temple -  Challakeramma Jathre is conducted once every five years.

 Bhavani Shankara temple -  situated at Lakshmipura, was bought from Varanasi more than 200 years back without being kept on the floor to maintain the sanctity of the idol.

Transport

Road connection 
Challakere is well connected to Bangalore, Bellary, Pavagada, and Chitradurga by road.
NH 150A which connects Chamarajanagara and Jevargi passes through the city. Chitradurga, which is the district headquarters, is 30 km from this city.

Education
 Government Engineering College
 Government First Grade College
 Government P. U. College
 Warriors English School
 Warriors P. U. College

Notable people
 Ta Ra Subba Rao - renowned Kannada novelist
 Challakere Brothers - known for chanting of Vedas

Gallery

References

External links

Cities and towns in Chitradurga district